The Camarines Sur National High School, also called CamHi, is the oldest national high school in Camarines Sur and one of the biggest public secondary schools in the Bicol Region, Philippines having a student population of 11,899 in the school year 2021–2022. It was established in 1902.

History

1900s

The Philippine Commission enacted Act No. 74 creating the Department of Public Instruction on January 21, 1901 and later that year, American educators known as Thomasites arrived in Ambos Camarines (the province's name before it was split into two, Camarines Sur and Camarines Norte) to teach the Bicolanos. 
On July 15, 1902, the school was launched as the Provincial High School of Nueva Caceres (former name of Naga City when it was still a town). Headed by its first principal Mr. Frank Crone and assisted by Ms. Minerva Udell, the institution started with 70 students and 4 American mentors. The attendance increased steadily and by the end of the first term there were 200 students. Then it was transferred somewhere in Mabini Street (now San Francisco) until it was transferred in 1915 to Via Gainza (now Peñafrancia Avenue), its present location. It was by then known as Camarines High School.

Japanese occupation
During the Japanese occupation of the Philippines from 1943 to 1945, the school was temporarily closed as its Gabaldon building (main building) served as a garrison for Japanese soldiers under a certain Colonel Isabashi.

American liberation
The school was re-opened during the American liberation in 1945 until it became dilapidated and was declared unsafe for occupancy in 1949.

The 1950s

In 1950, former city mayor Leon SA. Aureus initiated the organization of Camarines Sur High School Alumni Association. Additional school buildings were constructed in 1951 with the initiative of Provincial Governor Juan F. Trivino and batch 1933. Night classes were opened in 1968 until 1983 to address the needs of working students.

the 1960s to 1990s

On June 29, 1969, President Ferdinand Marcos approved Republic Act 5529, converting the institution into Camarines Sur National High School. In 1971, Camarines Sur Community College was established offering two-year post-secondary education. In 1977 to 1992 with Ms. Pura Luisa Magtoto as principal, more buildings and facilities were constructed including the Student Pavilion. A Balik Adal Project, a special community outreach program was launched in 1985 with the help of the Naga City local government. In 1991, the Engineering and Science Education Program was launched under the enriched curriculum in English, Science and Technology and Mathematics. In 1992 Mrs. Rosa Perez succeeded as principal for a short term.

The 1990s-2000s
In 1994 to 2002, under the leadership of Mrs. Elizabeth Palo, additional buildings were built including the Andaya and Roco Buildings. A Special Education Program and Special Program in the Arts were opened in 1999 and 2000 respectively. In 2001, the school represented Luzon to the Project Sterling Program, a peer accreditation to public secondary school sponsored by the Department of Education, Philippine Association of Secondary Schools Administrators and the University of Asia and the Pacific. The school was accredited in 2003.

Centennial Celebration

The school successfully celebrated its Centennial Foundation Anniversary on December 15, 2002, after a historical record was rectified that the actual date of its creation is June 15, 1902, and not in 1904. It was based on the researched made by Prof. Danilo Gerona a foremost Bikolano historian with the help of school's Centennial Research team composed of Mrs. Salve Lapuz, Mr. Jarme Taumatorgo and Ms. Yolanda Castor. In November 2002, Mrs. Nelly Abad became principal. Under her watch, Late Afternoon Class for working students reopened. New DepEd programs were offered namely: Special Program in Sports, Family Farm Curriculum, Strengthened Technical-Vocational Education Program, Career Pathway-Technology and Livelihood Education and Foreign Language (Spanish). Enrichment subjects for fast learners and remedial classes for specially challenged students were introduced. The school was a hall of fame awardee for the best Brigada Eskwela implementer nationwide for big school category- secondary level.

Present

Presently, the school is headed by the Principal IV, Dr. Sulpicio C. Alferez III together with the Assistant Principal II for Senior High School, Melissa B. Bobos; Assistant Principal II for Junior High School, Dr. Gemma O. Corporal; and Assistant Principal II for Operations and Learner Support. It has two campuses, the main one is along Peñafrancia Ave., Naga City's school belt and the annex is along M.T. Villanueva Ave. (formerly Liboton St.). The main campus is composed of 28 classroom-buildings, laboratories, and a student pavilion. The first two buildings built were the Main Building (also called the Gabaldon Building) and the Old Science Building in late 1900s. The Main Building is two-story, made up of stone and concretion the first floor and hardwood on the second floor including the floors. Presently, the main building houses on the first floor the guidance office, clinic, student government office and different departments while the library, speech lab and a big meeting hall are on the second floor. The one-story Old Science Building reconstructed in 1946 with the help of the American government now is dilapidated and temporarily houses the faculty and two big classrooms. Renovation is now being considered. The two-story Italianate Style Gabaldon Building on the right side of the Main Building houses the Administrative Staff including the Principal's Office, Auditor's Office, and the Educational Management Information Office. The Main Building was recently restored with help of the National Commission for Culture and the Arts. These three buildings are now being considered as cultural properties in consonance with the National Cultural Heritage Act (Republic Act No. 10066).

Curricula and Programs
 Basic Education Curriculum (BEC)
 Special Program in Sports (SPS)
 Special Program in the Arts (SPA)
 Science, Technology, and Engineering (STE)
 Special Program for Foreign Language (SPFL) 
 Strengthened Technical-Vocational Education Program (STVEP)
 Family Farming Curriculum (FFC)

School Publication 
The Official School Publication of Camarines Sur National High School are: The Isarog and Ang Isarog, English and Filipino respectively.

Estelito B. Jacob was the school paper adviser of the English Publication, The Isarog which is then succeeded by Bryan Cariaga since 2019, Jacob became the assistant school paper adviser.

Aileen A. Mangubat is the Adviser for the Filipino Publication, Ang Isarog.

Gallery

Notable people 
Nonoy Peña - YouTube sensation, singer-recording artist
Estelito Jacob - Bicolano writer, poet, artist
Alys Chan - Online personality

References 

Schools in Naga, Camarines Sur
Educational institutions established in 1902
High schools in Camarines Sur
1902 establishments in the Philippines